The 2012 Phillip Island 300 was a motor race for the Australian sedan-based V8 Supercars. It was the fifth event of the 2012 International V8 Supercars Championship. It was held on the weekend of 18–20 May at the Phillip Island Grand Prix Circuit, in Phillip Island, Victoria.

The event was the second in a row in which Ford Performance Racing dominated with Mark Winterbottom winning the Saturday race and Will Davison winning the Sunday race. Although the FPR duo won both races, Shane van Gisbergen was the best performed driver over the whole weekend.

Standings
 After 11 of 30 races.

Phillip
Motorsport at Phillip Island